Kim Clijsters was the defending champion, but lost in the second round to Jill Craybas.

Svetlana Kuznetsova won in an all-Russian final, 6–4, 6–3, against Maria Sharapova. It was her first Tier I title and sixth overall, and her first title of any kind since September 2004.

Seeds
All seeds received a bye into the second round.

Draw

Finals

Top half

Section 1

Section 2

Section 3

Section 4

Bottom half

Section 5

Section 6

Section 7

Section 8

External links
Main and Qualifying Draw

NASDAQ-100 Open - Women's Singles
2006 NASDAQ-100 Open